Novoye Gadari is a rural locality (a selo) in Zubutli-Miatlinsky Selsoviet, Kizilyurtovsky District, Republic of Dagestan, Russia. The population was 798 as of 2010. There are 11 streets.

Geography 
Novoye Gadari is located 13 km southwest of Kizilyurt (the district's administrative centre) by road. Zubutli-Miatli and Novy Sulak are the nearest rural localities.

Nationalities 
Avars live there.

References 

Rural localities in Kizilyurtovsky District